Ajit Singh (born 25 November 1936) is an Indian racewalker. He competed in the men's 20 kilometres walk at the 1960 Summer Olympics.

References

1936 births
Living people
Athletes (track and field) at the 1960 Summer Olympics
Indian male racewalkers
Olympic athletes of India
Place of birth missing (living people)